The Black Tower is a 1985 mystery television miniseries based on the 1975 book The Black Tower by P. D. James.

The title role of Commander Adam Dalgliesh was played by Roy Marsden.

References

External links

Television shows based on British novels
1985 television films
1985 films